Matthew Michael Serletic II (born 1970 or 1971) is an American record producer, songwriter, and music executive.

Career 
As a teenager, Serletic joined a band with members of Collective Soul, a group for which he would later produce. Serletic has worked with several other popular bands and artists for Atlantic Records, including Matchbox Twenty, Cher, Blessid Union of Souls, Edwin McCain, Stacie Orrico, Taylor Hicks, Rob Thomas, and singer/songwriter Angie Aparo. Serletic worked with American Idol winner David Cook on his second studio album. He also preceded Jason Flom as chairman of Virgin Records, a position he held from 2002 to 2005. He also worked with Joe Cocker, writing and producing his album, Hard Knocks and in 1999 he produced Santana's hit song "Smooth" on the Arista record label with Rob Thomas for what would be his first song as a solo artist (Thomas and Serletic were well known for making Matchbox Twenty's debut album Yourself or Someone Like You) and in 1998 he produced the song "I Don't Want to Miss a Thing" by Aerosmith on Hollywood Records, Epic Records, and Columbia Records for the film Armageddon. In 2011, he wrote the song "(Kissed You) Good Night" for the band Gloriana.

In 2004, at the age of 33, he was named to Crain's New York Business "40 Under 40" list. In 2011, Serletic became a reality show judge on the television show CMT's Next Superstar.

Personal life 
Serletic is the owner of Emblem Music Group and currently resides in Calabasas, California, with his wife, Ramona, and their two children. He also helped the rock supergroup Class of '99 in covering Pink Floyd's "Another Brick in the Wall" for the film The Faculty, contributing on the keyboard.

References

External links
 Emblem Music Group

Year of birth missing (living people)
Living people
Record producers from California
Grammy Award winners
People from Calabasas, California
Class of '99 members